Bad for Good is the only studio album by American songwriter Jim Steinman. Steinman wrote all of the songs and performed on most, although Rory Dodd contributed lead vocals on some tracks.

The songs were originally intended to be recorded by Meat Loaf as a follow up to Bat Out of Hell, titled Renegade Angel. However, Meat Loaf suffered vocal problems and was unable to sing. He would record several tracks from Bad for Good for his later albums.

The critical reaction to the album was mixed. Many reviews commented that Steinman's singing voice was inadequate for the songs. Despite this, the album was a major commercial success, breaking the UK Top 10.

History 
In the midst of the success of Bat Out of Hell, management and the record company put pressure on Steinman to stop touring in order to write a follow-up, provisionally titled Renegade Angel. Steinman joined Meat Loaf and his band for a live performance in Toronto, Ontario, Canada in 1978 with the intention of going through the songs for the new album after the show. However, someone broke into their dressing rooms during the show and stole several possessions, including the new lyric book. Many of the stolen songs would later appear on Bad for Good: "Surf's Up", "Left in the Dark" and "Out of the Frying Pan." Meat Loaf jokes that he does not think that Steinman ever got over that theft.

Meat Loaf lost his voice and was unable to record Renegade Angel. Steinman says "I spent seven months trying to make a follow-up [to Bat] with him, and it was an infernal nightmare. He had lost his voice, he had lost his house, and he was pretty much losing his mind." Not being able to "bear for people not to hear those songs," Steinman recorded the album, retitled Bad for Good, as a solo project, with Rory Dodd providing lead vocals on some songs. Many musicians and backing vocalists from Bat Out of Hell performed on Bad for Good, including Roy Bittan and Max Weinberg from Bruce Springsteen's E Street Band.

Richard Corben illustrated the cover, as he had done for Bat Out of Hell. Describing the cover, Sounds magazine says "the flesh, the puppy-fat on the mid-calf, the breasts, the upturned American nose ... Corben's evocation of teenage femininity is so right! The cover, though, is the product of an alternative universe, like everything else about this album. The nude gymnasium scene is out, along with the other title 'Renegade Angel'."

Around this time, Steinman contributed all eight songs for Meat Loaf's album Dead Ringer, which was also released in 1981.

Compositions 
The first two songs, "Bad for Good" and "Lost Boys and Golden Girls", were two of many songs written by Steinman under the inspiration of Peter Pan and lost boys who never grow up. This is reflected in lyrics in "Bad for Good" such as "You know I'm gonna be like this forever: I'm never gonna be what I should." The composer says that Peter Pan has "always been about my favorite story and I've always looked at it from the perspective that it's a great rock 'n' roll myth because it's about – when you get right down to it – it's about a gang of lost boys who never grow up, who are going to be young forever and that's about as perfect an image for rock'n'roll as I can think of." "Lost Boys and Golden Girls" is the basis for the musical Neverland, which Steinman says is "a rock 'n' roll science fiction version of Peter Pan that takes place in a city built on the ruins of Los Angeles after a series of chemical wars." Neverland never got past the workshop stage, although the stage musical Bat Out of Hell, scheduled to open in London in 2009, is based on the same concept.

The next track, "Love and Death and an American Guitar", is a spoken word fantasy monologue, performed by Steinman that he used to do in the Meat Loaf shows. It opens by quoting lyrics from Bat Out of Hell'''s "Paradise by the Dashboard Light" ("I remember everything. I remember every little thing as if it happened only yesterday. I was barely seventeen"), but instead of being "barely dressed" the protagonist "once killed a boy with a Fender guitar." Influenced by The Doors, Steinman wanted to write a piece where "the rhythm wasn't coming from the drums so much as the voice – the rhythm of the spoken voice and the heartbeat behind it."

The final two tracks were originally packaged with the LP on an additional vinyl disc. "The Storm" is an orchestral piece. "Rock and Roll Dreams Come Through" is, according to music website Sputnik Music, a celebration of "music being the only thing left to believe in, it is a cry to the musical gods, thanking them for the gifts they have been given." Similarly, AllMusic describes the song as "a heart-tugging testament to the inspirational power of rock and roll."

 Track listing 

On the original vinyl release, "The Storm" and "Rock and Roll Dreams Come Through" were the A-side and B-side, respectively, of a 33-rpm 7" single, enclosed with the album. These tracks, according to Steinman's concept, are supposed to be the prelude and epilogue, respectively, of the album. The position of these tracks varies on the various CD versions: the Australian CD release in 1989 included "The Storm" as track 1 and "Rock and Roll Dreams Come Through" as track 10, while a European issue from 1992 included both at the end of the album and an American release from the same era included "Rock and Roll Dreams" as track 5 and "The Storm" at the end. Also, the spoken word epilogue to "Left in the Dark" is omitted from some CD versions.

 Reception 

In addition to breaking the UK Top 10, the album reached number 63 in the Billboard Pop Albums chart, and peaked at number 14 in the Swedish Top 60 Albums. "Rock and Roll Dreams Come Through" was released as a single, reaching 14 in the Mainstream Rock chart, and number 32 in the Pop Singles chart.

The critical reaction to the album was mixed. Many reviews commented that Steinman's singing voice was inadequate for the songs. Rolling Stone, who also gave a lukewarm review of the first Bat, said "Steinman's thin, reedy voice simply cannot carry the absurd precocity of the lyrics". AllMusic also said retrospectively that Steinman "simply does not have the vocal range or lung power necessary to make this dramatic style of rock and roll work. For example...[in] "Left in the Dark", he struggles to keep up with vocal demands of this orchestral ballad, resulting in a vocal that sounds strained and occasionally off-key". Billboard magazine, though, said that "to the surprise of many, Steinman's vocals sounded stronger than expected".AllMusic also complained "that some of the songs repeat the Bat Out of Hell formula instead of building upon it; the obvious culprit in this arena is "Dance in My Pants", a duet that gratuitously recycles the battle of the sexes verbal sparring and the multi-part structure of Meat Loaf's "Paradise by the Dashboard Light" to less-impressive effect". However, they did praise "Surf's Up" and "Rock and Roll Dreams Come Through". They concluded that the album "is too inconsistent and eccentric to keep the attention of the casual listener, but remains an interesting listen for anyone who appreciates Jim Steinman's one-of-a-kind style of epic-size rock and roll".Rolling Stone criticized the "Wagnerian excess, feral "rock" playing and vile choristering," suggesting that "Todd Rundgren should have his wrists slapped for choking the upper end of his guitar's neck in a vainglorious approximation of epiphany". Sounds magazine offers a positive review, saying that it is the album "you've waited nearly four years for".

 Personnel 
Musicians
 Jim Steinman – lead vocals (except on "Lost Boys and Golden Girls", "Surf's Up" and "Rock and Roll Dreams Come Through"), co-lead vocals on “Dance in My Pants”, keyboards, spoken word
 Rory Dodd – lead vocals on "Lost Boys and Golden Girls", "Surf's Up" and "Rock and Roll Dreams Come Through"; backing vocals
 Karla DeVito – co-lead vocals on "Dance in My Pants"
 Todd Rundgren – guitars, backing vocals
 Davey Johnstone – guitars on "Bad for Good", "Stark Raving Love", "Surf's Up" and "Rock and Roll Dreams Come Through"; mandolin on "Surf's Up"
 Kasim Sulton – bass on "Bad for Good", "Out of the Frying Pan" and "Surf's Up"; backing vocals
 Steve Buslowe – bass on "Stark Raving Love", "Dance in My Pants" and "Rock and Roll Dreams Come Through"
 Neil Jason – bass on "Left in the Dark"
 Roy Bittan – piano (except on "Left in the Dark")
 Steven Margoshes – piano on "Left in the Dark", conductor (New York Philharmonic) on "The Storm", string arrangement on "Rock and Roll Dreams Come Through"
 Roger Powell – synthesizer on "Bad for Good", "Stark Raving Love" and "Dance in My Pants"
 Larry "Synergy" Fast – synthesizer on "Love and Death and an American Guitar"
 Max Weinberg – drums (except on "Stark Raving Love", "Dance in My Pants" and "Left in the Dark")
 Allan Schwartzberg – drums on "Left in the Dark"
 Joe Stefko – drums on "Stark Raving Love" and "Dance in My Pants"
 Jimmy Maelen – percussion
 Alan Rubin – trumpet on "Dance in My Pants" and "Rock and Roll Dreams Come Through"
 Tom Malone – horn arrangements and trombone on "Dance in My Pants" and "Rock and Roll Dreams Come Through"
 Lew Del Gatto – baritone saxophone on "Dance in My Pants" and "Rock and Roll Dreams Come Through"
 Lou Marini – tenor saxophone on "Dance in My Pants" and "Rock and Roll Dreams Come Through", solo on "Rock and Roll Dreams Come Through"
 Ellen Foley – backing vocals on "Bad for Good" and "Out of the Frying Pan"
 Eric Troyer – backing vocals
 Wil Malone – string arrangement on "Out of the Frying Pan"
 Charles Calello – conductor (New York Philharmonic) on "Left in the Dark"

Production
 Producers: John Jansen, Todd Rundgren, Jim Steinman, Jimmy Iovine
 Engineers: Tom Edmonds, John Jansen, Todd Rundgren, Gray Russell, Shelly Yakus
 Mixing: John Jansen
 Mastering: Greg Calbi, Ted Jensen, George Marino
 Production coordination: Gray Russell
 Arrangers: Roy Bittan, Todd Rundgren, Jim Steinman
 Art direction: John Berg
 Cover art concept: Jim Steinman
 Cover art: Richard Corben
 Photography: Don Hunstein

Charts

 Legacy 
Many of the tracks, or elements thereof, on Bad for Good have been recorded by other artists, including projects that Steinman has been involved in. He produced Barbra Streisand recording "Left in the Dark" for her album Emotion, with the single reaching No. 4 on the Adult Contemporary chart in 1984. Her version changes a few lines, with her version changing "so take off your dress" to "I watch you undress", to fit the song being sung from a female point of view.

The intro to "Stark Raving Love" was used for "Holding Out for a Hero", a 1984 hit for Bonnie Tyler. He used excerpts from "The Storm" for "Opening of the Box" on the Pandora's Box album Original Sin, and in the "Ouverture" for the musical Dance of the Vampires.

The refrain from "Bad for Good" ("God speed! Speed us away!") also appears in "Nowhere Fast", which Steinman wrote for the film Streets of Fire (1984).

Comedy duo Scharpling & Wurster, in their sketch "The Gas Station Dogs" from their album New Hope for the Ape-Eared, featured a delusional singer-songwriter promoting a song called "Rock n' Roll Dreams Will Come Through".

Meat Loaf has recorded most of Bad for Good:
 "Surf's Up" appears on his 1984 album Bad Attitude;
 "Rock and Roll Dreams Come Through", "Out of the Frying Pan (and Into the Fire)", "Love and Death and an American Guitar" (renamed "Wasted Youth", and still using Steinman's original voice with a new backing track), and "Lost Boys and Golden Girls" appear on Bat Out of Hell II: Back into Hell. These were the only covers of Meat Loaf's from Bad for Good that were produced by Steinman;
 "Left in the Dark" appears on Welcome to the Neighborhood (1995) (Meat uses the last line of Steinman's spoken word opening to the song, "who made the very first move" to end his version);
 "Bad for Good" on Bat Out of Hell III: The Monster Is Loose, with guest performer Brian May on guitar. In a documentary promoting the 2006 album, Meat Loaf acknowledged that there is a "core of fans that know that song", so he "had that under the microscope more than any other on the album". An excerpt of "The Storm" is used as intro to "Seize the Night" on Bat III''.

References

Jim Steinman albums
Albums produced by Jim Steinman
Albums produced by Todd Rundgren
Albums produced by Jimmy Iovine
Albums recorded at Record Plant (New York City)
1981 debut albums
Epic Records albums